Philip William Daniels (born 25 October 1958) is an English actor, musician and singer, most noted for film and television roles playing Londoners, such as the lead role of Jimmy Cooper in Quadrophenia, Richards in Scum, Stewart in The Class of Miss MacMichael, Danny in Breaking Glass, Mark in Meantime, Billy Kid in Billy the Kid and the Green Baize Vampire, Kevin Wicks in EastEnders, DCS Frank Patterson in New Tricks, and Grandad Trotter in the Only Fools and Horses prequel Rock & Chips. He is also known for featuring on Blur's 1994 hit single "Parklife".

Career
Daniels went to Rutherford Comprehensive School from 1970 to 1975, the same school as Danny John-Jules, Paul Hardcastle and footballer Tony Grealish. After training at the Anna Scher Theatre School in Islington, Daniels has made appearances in many films and television series.

He made his film debut in 1972 in Anoop and the Elephant. He had an incidental appearance (with fellow drama students) in 1975 in Thames Television's You Must Be Joking! In 1976, at the age of 17, he featured as a waiter in Bugsy Malone. Also in 1976 he had significant roles in three television series: The Molly Wopsies, Four Idle Hands, and The Flockton Flyer. Over the following four years he appeared in Quadrophenia, Breaking Glass and Scum. He also appeared in the 1977 TV drama serial Raven.

In the late 1970s and early 1980s, Daniels was a member of new wave band The Cross, along with fellow actor Peter Hugo Daly. They released an album (Phil Daniels + The Cross) and single, "Kill Another Night" on RCA Records in 1979.
His musical inclinations were revealed when he starred in a 1985 British snooker musical Billy the Kid and the Green Baize Vampire. He narrated tracks "Parklife" and "Me, White Noise" on the Parklife and Think Tank albums for Blur.

He contributed the voice of Fetcher, the dull-witted rat to the animated film Chicken Run. In recent years he has turned his attention to comedy, appearing in the series Sunnyside Farm and alongside Al Murray in the cult sitcom Time Gentlemen Please. Daniels also starred as Freddy Windrush in an episode of Gimme Gimme Gimme (Series 2, Episode 3 – "Prison Visitor").

Daniels has performed on stage with the Royal Shakespeare Company in plays such as The Merchant of Venice, The Jew of Malta and A Clockwork Orange. In 2004 he appeared in the BBC comedy-drama Outlaws as a criminal solicitor.

In 2006 he joined the cast of the popular BBC soap opera EastEnders playing Kevin Wicks. The actor temporarily left the show in early 2007; however, he returned in March 2007. He left the show in August 2007, with his character dying in a brutal car crash in December 2007. Daniels, along with his co-stars, attended a Quadrophenia Reunion at London Film and Comic Con at Earls Court on 1 and 2 September 2007. In May 2008, Daniels ran the London Marathon on behalf of the "Sparks" Charity, and, in December 2008, starred in Sheffield Theatre and Evolution Pantomimes co-production of Aladdin as "Abanazar" at Lyceum Theatre, Sheffield. In late 2008, Daniels voiced a major character in the English language re-release of the cult 2006 Norwegian animated film Free Jimmy, alongside Woody Harrelson and with dialogue written by Simon Pegg. Also in 2008, Daniels starred alongside Gary Stretch and Geoff Bell in the UK film Freebird, directed by Jon Ivay, which followed three bikers across a drug-fuelled ride in the Welsh countryside. Daniels appeared in the 2008 series of Strictly Come Dancing with dancing partner Flavia Cacace; he was the first to be eliminated from the show on 21 September 2008.

He appeared on Celebrity Mastermind: 2008/2009, finishing in second place on 24 points. On 26 June 2009, he appeared on stage with Blur at the M.E.N. Arena and then again on 28 June 2009 at Glastonbury 2009 on their song "Parklife", as well as on 2/3 July 2009 in their Hyde Park Concerts. Daniels portrayed Del Boy's grandfather in a prequel to the comedy series Only Fools and Horses called Rock & Chips, which was screened in January 2010 and, on 13 September 2010 on BBC Radio Five Live, James Buckley confirmed that Rock & Chips would be returning for two specials, one at Christmas 2010, and the other at Easter 2011. Daniels has subsequently reprised his role as Ted Trotter in both of the Rock & Chips specials. 2012 (2013 in the UK) saw the release of the film Vinyl in which Daniels not only stars but also wrote and performs most of the film's music soundtrack. Directed by Sara Sugarman, Vinyl is the story of an aging rock group forced to con the music industry to gain radio play of future record releases. The film is based on true events faced by The Alarm that took place in the UK in 2004.

In September 2012, Daniels appeared in a production of This House at the National Theatre's Cottesloe Theatre; it transferred to the Olivier in February 2013. In 2015, it was announced that he would play the role of Thenardier in Les Misérables. Daniels revisited his role in a revival of This House at Chichester's Minerva Theatre in September 2016 and appeared in the same play (November 2016 – Feb 2017) at the Garrick Theatre in London's West End. In 2017, he recorded two songs for the album Wit & Whimsy – Songs by Alexander S. Bermange (one solo and one featuring all of the album's 23 artists), which reached No. 1 in the iTunes comedy album chart.

Daniels was a contestant in the 2020 BBC Celebrity MasterChef.

In 2021, it was announced that Daniels will star alongside Jonathan Bailey, Taron Egerton and Jade Anouka in a production of Mike Bartlett’s Cock at the Ambassadors Theatre, London, in 2022.

Personal life
Daniels had a 30-year relationship with Jan Stevens, a record industry associate whom he met in the eighties, until her death from pancreatic cancer in 2012. They had one daughter, Ella born in 1990.

He is a Chelsea fan.

Filmography

Television work

House of the Dragon (2022) — Maester Gerardys
 The Mallorca Files (2021) – Frank Bottomley – Episode: “Son of a Pig”
 Adult Material (2020) – Dave – TV Series, 4 episodes
 I Hate Suzie (2020) – Phil (Suzie's Dad) – Episode: “Guilt”
 Celebrity Masterchef (2020) — Contestant
Endeavour (2018) – Charlie Thursday – Episodes: “Cartouche”, “Icarus”

Call the Midwife (2020) – George Benson – Episode: #9.4
Soccer AM (1 episode, 2016) — Himself
 Moonfleet (2 episodes, 2013) — Ratsey
Was It Something I Said? (1 episode, 2013) — Himself – Guest Narrator
Rock & Chips (3 episodes, 2010–2011) — Ted Trotter
New Tricks (2009–2010) – D.C.S. Frank Paterson – “The Last Laugh” (2009), “The Fourth Man” (2010)
Midsomer Murders (2010) – Teddy Molloy – TV Series, Episode: “The Noble Art”
The 100 Greatest World Cup Moments of All Time! (voice)
Breakfast (2 episodes, 2008–2010) — Himself
Blur: Live at Hyde Park, London – 2 July 2009 (2010) — Himself, Guest Vocals
Loose Women (3 episodes, 2008–2010) — Himself
Agatha Christie's Poirot (2009) – Inspector Hardcastle – Episode: “The Clocks”
Misfits (2009) – as Keith the Dog (Voice) – TV Series, Episode: #1.1
The Podge and Rodge Show (1 episode, 2009) — Himself
Mastermind (1 episode, 2009) — Himself
Strictly Come Dancing (4 episodes, 2008) — Himself
Strictly Come Dancing: It Takes Two (1 episode, 2008) — Himself
The ONE Show (1 episode, 2008) — Himself
Would I Lie to You? (1 episode, 2008) — Himself
EastEnders (2006–2008) – Kevin Wicks – TV Series, 208 episodes
Children in Need (1 episode, 2007) — Himself – Performer
British Film Forever (2 episodes, 2007) — Himself
The British Soap Awards 2007 (2007) — Himself
The 50 Greatest Television Dramas  (2007) — Himself
A Question of Sport (1 episode, 2006) — Himself
Cast & Crew (1 episode, 2005) — Himself
Wickham Road (2005) — Narrator
Outlaws (12 episodes, 2004) — Bruce Dunbar
Waking the Dead (1 episode, 2004) — Det Supt Andy Bulmer
The Long Firm (2004) — Jimmy
Time Gentlemen Please (36 episodes, 2000–2002) — Terry Brooks
Goodbye Charlie Bright (2001) — Eddie
Gimme Gimme Gimme (TV) (1 episode, 2000) — Freddy Windrush
Nasty Neighbours (2000) — Robert Chapman
Sex, Chips & Rock n' Roll (TV) (1999) — Larry Valentine
Sex & Chocolate (TV film) (1997) — Ian Bodger
Holding On (1997) — Gary Rickey
Sunnyside Farm (1997) — Raymond Sunnyside
The World of Lee Evans (1995) – Hitcher
One Foot in the Grave: The Wisdom Of The Witch (1995) — Melvin
Bad Behaviour (1993) — Nunn Brother
Lovejoy: Swings & Roundabouts (1993) – Boyd
’’Big Deal (series 3 ‘Panel Money’ 1986)The Pickwick Papers (1985) — Sam WellerMeantime (TV/Film) (1984) — Mark PollockI Remember Nelson (TV) (1982) — Will BlackieA Midsummer Night's Dream (1981) — PuckRaven (1977) — RavenThe Flockton Flyer (1976, broadcast 1977) — Don DavisFour Idle Hands (1976) — Mike DuddsThe Molly Wopsies (1976) — Alan MusgroveThe Naked Civil Servant (1975) — 1st Boy

RadioThe Old Curiosity Shop (1990) as Quilp, an adaptation for BBC Radio 4.The Personal History of David Copperfield (1991) as Uriah Heep, an adaptation for BBC Radio 4. The Tin Drum (1999) – Oskar MatzerathOn The Ceiling – Saturday Play, BBC Radio 4, 7 February 2009

TheatreAladdin Sheffield LyceumFresh KillsTrue WestThe Green ManThe Winter's TaleDealer's ChoiceCarousel The Closing Number Johnny Oil Strikes BackThe Lucky OnesThe Merchant of VeniceThe Jew of MaltaMeasure for MeasureThe Revenger's TragedyA Clockwork OrangeRosencrantz and Guildenstern Are DeadThe Beggar's OperaThe God of SohoAntony and CleopatraLes MiserablesThis HouseA Very Very Very Dark MatterDiscography
AlbumsPhil Daniels + The Cross (Phil Daniels + The Cross) (1979)
Singles
"Kill Another Night" (Phil Daniels + The Cross) (1979)
"Penultimate Person" (Phil Daniels + The Cross) (1980, Europe only)
"The Stranglers and Friends – Live in Concert". Phil Daniels is one of the singers in place of Hugh Cornwell, The Stranglers' lead singer who was imprisoned at the time (1980)
"Parklife" (Blur featuring Phil Daniels) (1994)
"Free Rock and Roll" from the film Vinyl (Phil Daniels, Keith Allen and The Alarm) (2013)
Other songs
"Me, White Noise" on Think Tank (Blur featuring Phil Daniels) (2003)

References

External links
 
 What's on TV profile
 "Phil Daniels: 'Playing to thousands of people with Blur is not as daunting as doing a play in a small theatre'", Interview by Hannah Olivennes, The Observer'', 19 June 2011.

1958 births
Alumni of the Anna Scher Theatre School
Living people
English male film actors
English male soap opera actors
People from Islington (district)
RCA Records artists
20th-century English male actors
21st-century English male actors